Destiny Etiko  (born 12 August 1989) is a Nigerian actress .

Early life and education
Etiko was born in údi, a village located precisely in Enugu state, a southeastern geographical area of Nigeria occupied predominantly by the igbo people of Nigeria. 
Etiko received both her primary and secondary school education in Enugu State where she obtained her First School Leaving Certificate and the West African Senior School Certificate. Etiko in bid to obtain a university degree relocated to Anambra state then applied to study Theater Arts In Nnamdi Azikiwe University located in Awka. Etiko was accepted and granted admission and eventually graduated with a degree in Theater Arts.

Career
Etiko described in an interview with Vanguard, a Nigerian newspaper, that after registering with the Actors Guild of Nigeria she ventured into the Nigerian movie industry commonly known as Nollywood in 2011 and described her experience then as a difficult one because she had to combine her acting career with her school requirements as she was still a student at the time. Etiko's career received prominence after she featured in a movie titled Idemili which was produced in 2012 by Ernest Obi but was not released until 2014. Her role in the movie earned her a City People Entertainment Awards nomination. Before her role in the movie titled Idemili, Etiko had appeared in other movies although did not receive prominent roles in them.

Awards and nominations

Personal life
Unlike what has become the norm in the Nigerian movie industry which is relocating to Lagos state in order to succeed as a creative, Etiko who was born in Enugu state, still resides there and has been living there throughout the course of her acting career. Etiko in an interview affirmed that she had been a victim of sexual harassment against women by male movie producers who are by far the majority as pertains movie productions in Nigeria. Etiko in 2019 gifted her mum an apartment and praised her for supporting her decision to become an actress. Her father on the other hand had vehemently opposed her decision to become an actress at the initial time. In May 2020, she lost her father.

Etiko created a non-profit organization called the Destiny Etiko Foundation, intended to improve the conditions of people living in poverty.

Selected filmography
The prince & I (2019)
Heart of Love (2019)
My sisters love (2019)
Poor Billionaire (2019)
Virgin goddess (2019)
Queen of love (2019)
The Sacred Cowry (2019)
The Return of Ezendiala (2019)
Barren Kingdom (2019)
Pains of the Orphan (2019)
Clap of Royalty (2019)
The Hidden Sin (2019)
Family Yoke (2019)
King’s Word (2019)
Sound of Evil (2019)
My Private Part (2019) as Stella
Power of Royalty (2019)
Sunset of Love (2019)
London Prince (2019)
Woman of Power (2019)
Tears of Regret (2018)
Evil Seekers (2017)
Fear of a Woman (2016)
3 Days to Wed (2016) 
The Storm (2016)
Living in Poverty (2020)
Hour of Victory (2020)
Wrong turn (2021)
Widows money (2022)
Helpless marriage
Daughters of Eagle (2022)

See also
 List of Nigerian actors

References

External links
 

Living people
21st-century Nigerian actresses
Igbo actresses
1989 births
People from Udi
Nnamdi Azikiwe University alumni
Actresses from Enugu State
Nigerian humanitarians
Nigerian philanthropists